A phenomenological model is a scientific model that describes the empirical relationship of phenomena to each other, in a way which is consistent with fundamental theory, but is not directly derived from theory. In other words, a phenomenological model is not derived from first principles. A phenomenological model forgoes any attempt to explain why the variables interact the way they do, and simply attempts to describe the relationship, with the assumption that the relationship extends past the measured values. Regression analysis is sometimes used to create statistical models that serve as phenomenological models.

Examples of use
Phenomenological models have been characterized as being completely independent of theories, though many phenomenological models, while failing to be derivable from a theory, incorporate principles and laws associated with theories. The liquid drop model of the atomic nucleus, for instance, portrays the nucleus as a liquid drop and describes it as having several properties (surface tension and charge, among others) originating in different theories (hydrodynamics and electrodynamics, respectively). Certain aspects of these theories—though usually not the complete theory—are then used to determine both the static and dynamical properties of the nucleus.

See also 

 Phenomenology (physics)

References 

Statistical models
Philosophy of statistics